The Aeromarine K-6 is an aircraft engine built by the Aeromarine Plane and Motor Company in 1915. It is an Aeromarine 90hp with a .571 reduction gear. The addition of the reduction gear allowed the engine to produce more power by operating at a higher RPM. This engine made its peak power of 100 hp at 2000 rpm

Specifications

References

Further reading
 
 

1910s aircraft piston engines